Dan Bus Company is an Israeli bus company based in Tel Aviv. It operates local bus service in the Tel Aviv Metropolitan Area (Gush Dan) as well as some intercity bus services between the Gush Dan area and nearby regions.

History
Dan was founded as a cooperative on 1 December 1945, from the merger of 2 companies, Galei HaMaavir and Ihud Regev. It demutualised, becoming a limited company in May 2002. Dan operates 1,200 buses and has 2,400 employees. It transports over 600,000 passengers daily. In 2009, 23.5% of all Israeli bus travelers used Dan's lines. Dan provides bus service six days a week. From Friday afternoon until after Sunset Saturday night, service is suspended in observance of the Jewish Sabbath. Dan buses run until approximately 23:30 p.m. and resume service in the early morning hours.

In September 2009, Dan and Veolia reached an agreement on the purchase of  Veolia's share in the Jerusalem Light Rail for $15–20 million. In October 2010, Veolia reneged and said it would sell its stake to Egged. As a result, Dan sued Veolia.

In 2015, Dan established the subsidiary Dan BaDarom (Dan South) to compete on tenders in southern Israel. In May 2015, Dan BaDarom won a tender to operate bus routes in the Northern Negev and in February 2016, Dan BaDarom started to operate these routes. In January 2016, Dan BaDarom won a tender to operate the urban routes in Be'er Sheva.

In May 2022, Dan group purchased TST, the bus operator in Setúbal area from Arriva.

Metronit

Since 2013, Dan has been contracted to operate the Metronit bus rapid transport system in Haifa and the Krayot suburbs until October 15, 2021 where Dan was replaced with Superbus as the Metronit’s operator.

See also

Kavim
Transport in Tel Aviv

References

External links

Dan Bus Company (English) (Hebrew)

Bus companies of Israel
Transport in Tel Aviv
Former worker cooperatives
Israeli brands
Cooperatives in Israel